Trout Masters is the name of an NC outfitting group and annual fishing tournament taking place in the Wilson's Creek district of Pisgah National Forest in Western North Carolina.  The invitation only tournament takes place on the opening day of trout fishing season, normally the first Saturday in April, but has since been moved to June due to extreme weather conditions in early April (snow, wind, lava, etc). Entrants begin fishing Thursday morning through Saturday evening.  Wilson's creek is stocked by the North Carolina Fish Hatcheries division of N.C Game and Wildlife Commission.  The river is stocked with Rainbow, Brook, and Brown trout.

Unlike most fishing tournaments which judge by weight of catch, Troutmasters fish are judged by length from tip to tail.  By catching the longest fish, the Troutmasters winning fisherman is awarded ownership of the coveted Troutmasters trophy until the next tournament.  The trophy is engraved with the names of previous winners.

Other traditions unique to the tournament include the Mezcal opening ceremony, taking place on the Thursday evening prior to the fishing tournament.  The ceremony begins with a reading of "The Mystique of Mezcal", followed by a sampling of the liquor.  Tournament participants may also elect to read a short passage of their own.

A horseshoe tournament was added to the weekend's festivities in 2002. 
"The Golden Horseshoe" tournament is composed of two-man teams, competing in "best of three" matches. The rules include a beer can a top the post that count for additional points (5) if knocked off or pierced through.  
The tournament uses a double elimination format, with the championship match normally taking place on Saturday afternoon.

Trout Masters

2022 Derek Paige

2021 Derek Paige

2020 Jason "Winston" Osborne

2019 Derek Paige

2018 Jason "Bru" Smith

2017 Jason "Winston" Osborne 

2016 Derek Paige

2015 Rob Horton

2014 Scott Perry

2013 Rob Horton

2012 Scott Perry

2011 Gibby Bates

2010 Jason "Winston" Osborne

2009 Rob Horton

2008 Jason "Winston" Osborne

2007 Jason "Bru" Smith

2006 Rob Horton

2005 Gibby Bates

2004 Jason "Bru" Smith

2003 Teddy P

2002 Teddy P

2001 Foo Foo

2000 Jason "Bru" Smith

Golden Horseshoe Champions

2020 Jeff Bernia and Tyler Owens

2019 Mother Nature

2018 Sean and Chris

2017 Jason "Winston" Osborne and Mark Del-Colle

2016 Bru and Hensley

2015 Jonathan Reekes and Tony Sweet Tea Watkins

2014 Winston and Rob Hensley

2013 Winston and Rob Hensley

2012 Scott Perry and Mark Del-Colle

2011 Scott Perry and Mark Del-Colle

2010 Brad Rice and Scott Franklin

2009 Scott Perry and Mark Del-Colle

2008 Bru and Rob Horton

2007 Bru and Rob Horton

2006 Franklin and Brad R

2005 Franklin and Tony G

2004 Franklin and Brad R

2003 Teddy P and Joe

2002

See also
 Trout
 Trout worms
 Fishing

Fishing tournaments
Pisgah National Forest
Sports competitions in North Carolina